Beno Bryant (born January 1, 1971) is a former American football return specialist and running back for the Seattle Seahawks.

High school
Bryant attended Susan Miller Dorsey High School, participating in both football and track.  In 1989, Bryant set a city record of 46.63 in the 400 meters.

College career
Bryant played at the University of Washington from 1989 to 1993, using a redshirt year in 1992.  He holds many of Washington's career return records and was named to the 1990 All-Pacific-10 Conference football team as return specialist.  The Seattle Times named Bryant as Washington's #3 special teams player of the Pac-10 era.

Professional career
In 1994, Bryant played in two games for the Seattle Seahawks.  Bryant was drafted in 1996 and played for the Amsterdam Admirals of the World League of American Football, and then was drafted in 1997 by the Frankfurt Galaxy.

References

External links
 
 College stats as Sports Reference

1971 births
Living people
American football running backs
Amsterdam Admirals players
Seattle Seahawks players
Washington Huskies football players
Players of American football from Los Angeles
Susan Miller Dorsey High School alumni